Pavelescu is a Romanian surname. Notable people with the surname include:

Aurelian Pavelescu (born 1964), Romanian politician
Cincinat Pavelescu (1872–1934), Romanian poet and playwright
Octavian Pavelescu (born 1942), Romanian rower

Romanian-language surnames
Patronymic surnames